Potrero metro station is a station of the Mexico City Metro built along Insurgentes Norte Avenue in the colonias (neighborhoods) of Capultitlan and Guadalupe Insurgentes, in Gustavo A. Madero, Mexico City. It is an at-grade station with one island platform served by Line 3 (the Olive Line) between Deportivo 18 de Marzo and La Raza stations. The station and its surrounding area are named this way because there used to be a hippodrome during the Porfiriato era (1876–1911) and its pictogram features the silhouette of a head of a horse behind a fence. The station was opened on 1 December 1979, on the first day of service between Indios Verdes and Hospital General metro stations.

In 2019, the station had an average daily ridership of 17,308 passengers, making it the 106th busiest station in the network and the third-least used in the line. The facilities are partially accessible for people with disabilities as it is equipped with access ramps.

Location and layout

Potrero is a metro station located along Insurgentes Norte Avenue, in Gustavo A. Madero, Mexico City. The station serves the colonias (Mexican Spanish for "neighborhood") of Capultitlan and Guadalupe Insurgentes. Within the system, it is found between Deportivo 18 de Marzo and La Raza stations.

From there, commuters can ride different routes and transport methods, including Routes 25 and 104 of the Red de Transporte de Pasajeros (RTP) system and Route 15-C of the public bus system. It is serviced by Line 1 of the Metrobús service at Potrero bus station.

Exits
There are four exits:
Northeast: Insurgentes Norte Avenue and Victoria Avenue, Guadalupe Insurgentes.
Northwest: Insurgentes Norte Avenue and Poniente 116, Capultitlan.
Southeast: Insurgentes Norte Avenue and Excélsior Street, Guadalupe Insurgentes.
Northwest: Insurgentes Norte Avenue and Poniente 112, Capultitlan.

History and construction
Line 3 of the Mexico City Metro was built by Ingeniería de Sistemas de Transportes Metropolitano, Electrometro, and Cometro, the latter a subsidiary of Empresas ICA; Potrero metro station opened on 1 December 1979, on the first day of the Indios Verdes–Hospital General service. The station was built at grade level. Horse, mammoth, fish and bird remains were found during its construction.

Potrero station has a partially disabled-accessible service with access ramps. The station's pictogram features the silhouette of a head of a horse behind a fence. The station and its surrounding area are named this way because there used to be a hippodrome during the Porfiriato era (1876–1911; Ex Hipódromo de Peralvillo in modern times); its paddocks were found in its northern zone.

Incidents
On 14 December 2018, a private vehicle crashed into the Insurgentes Norte and Victoria entrance's walls after it was impacted by a public bus with no injuries reported. On 19 July 2021, a man was stabbed and killed in the CETRAM's corridors in an apparent robbery. On 7 January 2023, two trains crashed inside the Potrero–La Raza interstation tunnel while both were going toward Indios Verdes metro station; one person was killed and 106 resulted injured.

Ridership
According to the data provided by the authorities since the 2000s, commuters have averaged per year between 8,200 and 25,500 daily entrances in the last decade. In 2019, before the impact of the COVID-19 pandemic on public transport, the station's ridership totaled 6,317,545 passengers, which was an increase of 48,482 passengers compared to 2018. In the same year, Potrero metro station was the 106th busiest station of the system's 195 stations, and it was the line's third-least used.

Notes

References

External links
 
 
 

1979 establishments in Mexico
Accessible Mexico City Metro stations
Mexico City Metro Line 3 stations
Mexico City Metro stations in Gustavo A. Madero, Mexico City
Railway stations opened in 1979